Birger Erling Nilsen (10 October 1896 – 19 October 1968) was a Norwegian sport wrestler.

He was born in Kristiania and represented the club SK av 1909. He competed at the 1928 Summer Olympics, where he placed fourth in Freestyle wrestling. He won a bronze medal in the lightweight class at the 1922 World Wrestling Championships.

References

External links
 

1896 births
1968 deaths
Sportspeople from Oslo
Olympic wrestlers of Norway
Wrestlers at the 1928 Summer Olympics
Norwegian male sport wrestlers
World Wrestling Championships medalists
20th-century Norwegian people